The Americus Limestone is a member of the Foraker Limestone Formation in eastern Kansas, where it is quarried as a distinctive ornamental stone. In outcrop, it is typically recognized as two relatively thin but persistent beds of hard limestone separated by shale that forms the lowest prominent bench of the many benches of the Flint Hills. The recognizable facie of the member in excavated or eroded exposures is two thin limestone beds separated a bed of shale and adjacent shales above and below having a particular gray or bluish color darker than higher limestones. A third, lower, highly variable algal limestone is often present and included as the base of the member. Initially thought to be the lowest of the Permian rock of Kansas and as such classified as the lowest unit of the Council Grove Group, the unit is now dated within the uppermost Late Carboniferous.

Lithologic character
Limestone couplet: The common recognition of the Americus Limestone is a persistent, wide-ranging pair of durable limestone beds separated by shale. These two limestone beds may be referred to as upper and lower Americus Limestone beds. However, this terminology can lend to confusion with a third limestone bed that sometimes can be found below this pair, and, where found, is included within the Americus member.

The variability of this bed is employed to reconstruct the range of environments represented by the outcrop. The base of this limestone, where present, is consistently formed of Collenia stromatolites. The stromatolite base of this limestone can overlie orange lime-sand mudstone to grainstone recording the advancement a shoreline through the area creating the open shallow sea environment where the upper limestones would form. This bed is typically not illustrated on Group and Series scale charts.

Relatively, the paired limestones record broad environmental events across a wide shallow sea while the lowest limestone records a transgressive shoreline.

Bedding 
 Bed #5 Limestone: Dark gray to blue-gray shalely-to-hard limestone, few inches to well over a foot thick. Abundant fusulinids and crinoid columnals.
 Bed #4 Shale/Limestone: Tan to gray shale varying from clayey to silty. This shale thins to the north, while south into Oklahoma, it becomes a limestone distinct from the limestone beds above and below. 
 Bed #3 Limestone: Dark grey to blue-grey shalely-to-hard limestone, few inches to well over a foot thick. Abundant variety of macrofossils; brachiopods, pelecypods, gastropods, horn corals, etc. 
 Bed #2 Shale: This shale spans the gap between the lowest limestone bed #1 and the upper pair of limestone beds and (#3 & #5). Earlier authors may have included it within the upper Hamlin Shale Member of the Janesville Shale. The depth of this bed varies from over  weastward, but thins and pinches out eastward as the lower limestone coleses with the other limestones. The depths of this bed are interpreted as indicating variations in bottom elevation of the shallow near-shore environments. 
 Bed #1 Limestone: This bed's foundation of tidal stromatolites are interfilled with sorted limey microfossils and covered by skeletal limestone layers of gastropods, pelecypods, and some brachiopods. Eastward towards the presumed paleoshoreline, this bed approaches and coalesces with the base of the lower of the upper paired limestone beds; while westward this bed thins and presumably disappears.
 This limestone has been confused for the Houchen Creek limestone bed of the Hamlin Shale Member of the Janesville Shale. Both are limestones found below the upper paired limestones, and both have large masses of tidal Collenia stromatolite; however, the Houchen Creek's stromatolite mounds are more widely spaced and are directly blanketed by shale rather than the skeletal limestone that encases the Americus stromatolites.

Commercial use
The limestone beds are quarried for construction material. The tougher uppermost limestone bed in particular is sold commercially as Tuxedo Gray or "Flint Hills Gray", and is popular in eastern Kansas for its abundant visible fossils, gray tone that contrasts with the buff tone of Cottonwood Limestone, and the ability of the stone to take a polish that accentuates both the fossils and darker gray color.

Examples of construction use
 Kansas State Archives, flooring, stairs, and table 
 Kansas State Capitol, lobby
 Kansas State University Student Union, courtyard lighting plinths, walls, and fountain
 Robert J. Dole Institute of Politics, exterior lower courses

Fossils
As much of the Americus environment was shallow seawater with tidal currents, the formation is known for abundant, fragmented, and sorted remains of fusilinids, crinoids, brachiopods, and stromatolites.

See also

 List of fossiliferous stratigraphic units in Kansas
 Paleontology in Kansas

References

Further reading
 
 While the upper two limestone are consistent and reflect more open marine conditions, this study reports that the lower limestone records several different transient near-shore tidal and subtidal environments.
 
 The fauna of the Hughes Creek Member is very similar to the underlying Americus Limestone Member.

Carboniferous Kansas
Carboniferous southern paleotropical deposits